These are the Hong Kong Island results of the 2008 Hong Kong legislative election. The election was held on 7 September 2008 and all 6 seats in Hong Kong Island were contested. The pan-democracy camp retained four seats as compared to pro-Beijing camp's two seats, with Civic Party successfully get two candidates, newcomer Tanya Chan and Audrey Eu who stood as second candidate on their list. Pro-Beijing independent Regina Ip who lost the 2007 Hong Kong Island by-election less than a year ago, won a new seat.

Overall results
Before election:

Change in composition:

Candidates list

See also
Legislative Council of Hong Kong
Hong Kong legislative elections
2008 Hong Kong legislative election

References

2008 Hong Kong legislative election